Michael Martin Burgoyne (27 March 1951 – 22 November 2016) was a New Zealand rugby union player. A flanker, Burgoyne represented North Auckland at a provincial level, and was a member of the New Zealand national side, the All Blacks, in 1979. He played six matches for the All Blacks including games against Argentina and Italy, but neither was recognised as a full international by the New Zealand Rugby Union. Of Ngāti Kahu descent, Burgoyne made eight appearances for New Zealand Māori between 1975 and 1979.

Burgoyne died suddenly in 2016 while on the Fijian island of Yanuca.

References

1951 births
2016 deaths
People from Kaitaia
New Zealand rugby union players
New Zealand international rugby union players
Northland rugby union players
Māori All Blacks players
Rugby union flankers
Ngāti Kahu people